Bleddyn Jones (7 August 1948 ― 27 April 2021) was a Welsh rugby commentator who worked principally for BBC Radio Leicester, commentating on Leicester Tigers matches since 1987.  As a player, he made 333 appearances for Tigers, mostly at fly-half between 1969 and 1978, scoring 42 tries. He was not capped internationally.  In his professional life he worked as a teacher.  For the opening of the Caterpillar Stand at Welford Road in 2007, Jones was voted by readers of the Leicester Mercury into the "Walk of Legends" Team, ahead of Les Cusworth, Andy Goode and Joel Stransky.
Bleddyn died on 27 April 2021, aged 72.

References

External links 
Video about Bleddyn mostly in Welsh: http://www.wedi7.com/Items/Archive/Default.aspx?id=1119

1948 births
2021 deaths
Leicester Tigers players
Rugby union fly-halves
Welsh rugby union commentators
BBC sports presenters and reporters
People from Brynamman